The Bras Saint-Victor (in English: Saint-Victor arm) is a tributary of the west shore of the Chaudière River which flows northward to empty onto the south shore of the St. Lawrence River. It flows in the administrative region of Chaudière-Appalaches, in Quebec, in Canada, in Beauce-Sartigan Regional County Municipality: municipalities La Guadeloupe and Saint-Éphrem-de-Beauce; and Robert-Cliche Regional County Municipality: municipalities Saint-Victor, Saint-Jules and Beauceville.

Toponymy 
The toponym “bras Saint-Victor” was made official on December 5, 1968, at the Commission de toponymie du Québec.

See also 

 List of rivers of Quebec

References 

Rivers of Chaudière-Appalaches